VRG  may refer to:

Varig, a Brazilian airline
Ventral respiratory group, a column of neurons located in the medulla
Viktor Rydberg Gymnasium, a group of Swedish schools
Vintage Racer Group, a vintage racing group in the United States
Virtual Racing Group, more important simracing group in Italy
Virchand Gandhi, an Indian Patriot